Diego Daniel Cardozo (born 2 June 1987) is an Argentinian footballer who plays as an offensive midfielder for Independiente Rivadavia.

References

External links

1987 births
Living people
Argentine footballers
Argentine expatriate footballers
Instituto footballers
Quilmes Atlético Club footballers
Boca Unidos footballers
Guillermo Brown footballers
Club Real Potosí players
Unión Magdalena footballers
Independiente Rivadavia footballers
Club Atlético Atlanta footballers
Atlante F.C. footballers
San Martín de San Juan footballers
Categoría Primera A players
Bolivian Primera División players
Primera Nacional players
Primera B Metropolitana players
Argentine Primera División players
Ascenso MX players
Association football midfielders
Argentine expatriate sportspeople in Bolivia
Expatriate footballers in Bolivia
Argentine expatriate sportspeople in Colombia
Expatriate footballers in Colombia
Argentine expatriate sportspeople in Mexico
Expatriate footballers in Mexico
Footballers from Santa Fe, Argentina